Howard Fine (born November 28, 1958) is an American acting teacher, celebrity acting coach, Broadway theater director, and author. He is the founder of the Howard Fine Acting Studio in Hollywood and in Melbourne, Australia.

Early life
Fine was born in Providence, Rhode Island, he is the youngest of five children. His parents, Max, an American GI, and Nelly, a Holocaust survivor, were married in Shanghai before returning to the U.S. Due to a fluke scheduling conflict between French and German classes, Fine ended up taking his first theater class in high school. Fine's drama teacher spotted his directing talent and entrusted him with his first play to direct, Edward Albee's The Sandbox, at the age of 16. He was first introduced to the work of his mentor, Uta Hagen, while in high school. Fine's high school drama teacher taught from Hagen's first book, Respect for Acting, and would eventually take his class to New York City to watch classes at Hagen's studio. Howard never studied with Uta as an actor, and by the time they met they were each established teachers in their field. Their mutual love of teaching led to a close friendship between them which lasted until Hagen's death in 2004.

Career

Early career
Fine completed his BA in Communication/Theater at Rhode Island College. After completing graduate school in Boston, Fine moved to New York City, where he landed his first teaching job at the American Musical and Dramatic Academy. After one semester of teaching, he was promoted to head of the Acting Department at the age of 24, making him the youngest head in the studio's history. It was here that he developed a year-long training program known as "The Foundation", a version of which he still teaches at his studios in Los Angeles and Melbourne, Australia.

Acting teacher
In 1985, Fine moved to Los Angeles with his best friend, Voice coach David Coury. Fine began his career in Los Angeles by privately coaching students in his living room, but in 1988, he had to expand to accommodate his growing classes. His studio has relocated several times since this 1980's before occupying its present location, 1320 N Highland Ave, at Fountain. Fine received national recognition for his teaching in 2006 when named "Best Acting Teacher in Los Angeles" in Back Stage West "Best of Los Angeles" issue.
Fine is still a full-time acting teacher and coach, and throughout the year he teaches his 9-week Foundation course, as well as several sections of ongoing scene study. His techniques are mostly derivative of Uta Hagen's teachings, and offer actors a practical approach of working in all media: whereas most acting schools focus on either imagination or hyper-realism, Fine believes actors need both. The Howard Fine Acting Studio is home to a unique Speech & Singing for Actors program, various intensives for actors of all experience levels, and a monthly series of entertainment industry talks made available to the public. He also offers annual masterclasses in Sydney, Australia, and at his studio in Melbourne, Australia. Howard is an adjunct faculty member for the University of Texas Austin's Theater & Dance Department, and teaches students visiting from various college/conservatory programs at his Los Angeles studio. Fine has a list of students spanning decades which include working actors, celebrity singers, professional athletes, and artists who have gone on to win Tony, Emmy, and Academy Awards.

Theater director
In addition to being an acting coach, Fine is also an accomplished theater director. His sole Broadway credit is for directing Michael Chiklis when he replaced Rob Becker in Defending the Caveman. The Internet Broadway Data Base and Playbill records of this production are incomplete. However, this credit has been verified by other sources including Backstage Magazine. Chiklis details the experience in the foreword of Howard's book, and physical copies of the original playbill credit Howard Fine as the director. Other credits include directing Elizabeth Berkley, Aasif Mandvi, Ally Sheedy, and Rachel Dratch in David Lindsay-Abaire's That Other Person as part of the best of the 24-hour plays on Broadway. Howard is credited in the published version of the play. He won a Drama-logue award and received an Ovation Award nomination for his direction of Billy Campbell in Fortinbras.

Author
Fine is the author of Fine on Acting: A Vision of the Craft, from Havenhurst Books. In his book, Fine offers specifics on his technique as well as practical exercises designed to help actors in all levels of the industry. The book features a foreword by actor Michael Chiklis who writes, "His philosophy and approach to the craft of acting are the most helpful, encouraging and practically applicable I’ve ever encountered." Fine also occasionally contributes to a blog containing teaching insights, expanded thoughts from topics covered in his book, and new thoughts for actors in the ever-changing landscape of show business.

For years, Fine has been asked by the Los Angeles Times to analyze the acting of the Oscar nominees. His Oscar commentary has been featured on Entertainment Tonight, Extra, Access Hollywood, E, Sky TV, BBC, and CNN. In addition to the Los Angeles Times, Fine has been quoted in The Times, The Christian Science Monitor, and USA Today Weekend, and has spoken on numerous radio shows in both the US and overseas. Fine has also contributed to the Huffington Post with commentary on current events.

Popular mentions
 Howard was mentioned by Tisha Campbell in her July 2022 interview with the Wall Street Journal. 
 Howard appears in the Disney+ show "Earth to Ned" as an acting coach for a fictional being from another world.
 In 2020, Howard was featured in an episode NBC's 1st Look as the acting coach who helps Johnny "Bananas" develop his craft.
 In 2019, Howard was a guest on The Drawing Room, with Patricia Karvelas, a production of ABC Radio National in Australia.
 Howard was mentioned on CBS's 60 Minutes during an interview with FBI agent and author Tamer El-noury. In the interview, El-noury credited Fine with giving him acting training which saved his life while working undercover to disrupt a terror cell.
 Howard and his training are credited in the New York Times bestseller "American Radical: Inside the World of an Undercover Muslim FBI Agent, with helping the author foil a major terror plot. A film adaptation of this story is set to star Rami Malek.
 Howard Fine is thanked in the credits of the 2017 Sundance Audience Award-winning film "Crown Heights" and has coached both the film's producer Nnamdi Asomugha , and Nnamdi's spouse: noted actress Kerry Washington. 
 In an "In Conversation" series produced by his Los Angeles studio, Howard was thanked and publicly credited by numerous industry colleagues including notable casting directors, managers, agents, and celebrities such as Austin Butler, Elizabeth Berkeley, and Jim Belushi. 
 Howard is a longtime coach and friend of actress Elizabeth Berkeley, who has mentioned Howard in numerous interviews and social media posts.
 In the 1990s, "Uta Hagen's Acting Class" was filmed primarily at Howard's studio in Los Angeles. In this widely viewed video special featuring Uta Hagen, Howard can be seen in the audience along with many students at the time including Academy Award winner Jared Leto.
 Howard's Broadway directorial debut was made in 1995 with Rob Becker's "Defending the Caveman", starring longtime student Michael Chiklis. The show would go on to become the longest running one-man show on Broadway, with subsequent productions in Las Vegas.
 Howard Fine's studio was mentioned by the character of "Johnny Drama" in the "I Love You Too" episode of HBO's popular comedy series "Entourage" (season 2, episode 9), a nod to Howard's long and notable career coaching many celebrities, including many of the top-billed cast on the show itself.
 Carla Gugino has spoken publicly on her training with Howard, and Backstage published an interview in 2010 detailing their history of working together.
 Fine has appeared as himself in numerous reality shows, including Dance Moms, Confessions of a Teen Idol, Next Action Star, The Anna Nicole Show, MTV's The Big Picture, It Girls, Twenty Four-Seven, and on many E! True Hollywood Story and Biography episodes. He also appeared as himself in the film Spiritual Warriors.

Charitable works
Fine's favorite charity is Project Angel Food. He directed 10 consecutive years of the critically acclaimed benefit Divas Simply Singing, which featured such artists as Roberta Flack, Tina Arena, Melissa Manchester, The Pussycat Dolls, Whoopi Goldberg and Sharon Stone. He, along with Producer Paul Papile, created In Concert, which benefits Project Angel Food and has featured such artists as Deborah Gibson, Michael Chiklis, James Belushi, Sam Harris, and Tisha Campbell-Martin. Each year as part of their holiday celebration, Fine's Los Angeles studio holds a toy drive benefiting the Toys for Tots organization, and gives back to those in need.

References

External links
 
 

1958 births
Living people
American theatre directors
Drama teachers